Hades Nebula is a 1987 vertically scrolling shooter for the Commodore 64, ZX Spectrum and Atari ST by Nexus Information Systems. The player controls an upgradable fighter that must battle its way through thousands of enemy ships before it confronts the final boss, Emperor Hades. There are fifteen levels.

Gameplay

Enemies are face-like ships or bug-like ships that materialise at certain points in the game. Upon appearance they immediately seek out the player's ship and collide with it unless evasive action is taken. Also, every one or two levels or so, 'mother ship' bosses are encountered that take a considerable amount of bullet dodging and incisive shots to destroy.

There are two sound options while playing the game; either sound effects or the musical soundtrack by Ben Daglish. The latter is the default mode, and changes depending on whether you are fighting a boss or charging through a level.

Development
Hades Nebula was developed by Nexus Information Systems. Ben Daglish provided the music for the Commodore 64 version, while John Brozovski made the sound effects for the Atari ST.

Reception

A review of the Commodore 64 version in Zzap!64 criticized the game's immense difficulty, citing the unwieldy ship as the primary factor. Although the graphics and presentation were considered well done, the game was considered unplayable, receiving a rating of 55% from the magazine. A review of the ZX Spectrum version in Your Sinclair described it as "another standard shoot-em-up", giving it a 7 out of 10 rating.

References

External links
 

Hades Nebula at Atari Mania

1987 video games
Atari ST games
Commodore 64 games
ZX Spectrum games
Vertically scrolling shooters
Video games scored by Ben Daglish
Video games developed in the United Kingdom